Mehmet Akif Pasha (1822–1893), also known as Arnavut Mehmet Akif Pasha (Mehmet Akif Pasha the Albanian) and Kalkandereli Mehmet Akif Pasha, was an Ottoman-Albanian statesman and governor of the Ottoman Empire.

From the year 1860 to 1893, he was the governor of nine provinces:

Salonica Vilayet
Danube Vilayet
Bosnia Vilayet
Prizren Vilayet
Janina Vilayet
Adrianople Vilayet
Baghdad Vilayet
Konya Vilayet
Vilayet of the Archipelago

Between March 1874 and June 1875, Mehmet Akif was appointed Minister of Justice. In addition, he was head of the Council of State (Şura-yı Devle).

References

19th-century Albanian people
1893 deaths
1822 births
People from Tetovo
Albanian Pashas
Albanians in North Macedonia